Donna Taggart is a Celtic singer and musician. Born in Omagh in County Tyrone in Northern Ireland, she first came to prominence in 2011, when her acclaimed debut album Celtic Lady Vol. 1 was picked up by highly respected BBC Radio Ulster presenter Gerry Anderson. She shot to fame in 2016, with over 27 million Facebook views of her video rendition of "Jealous of the Angels", which was written by Jenn Bostic in 2010.

References

Date of birth missing (living people)
Living people
Women singers from Northern Ireland
People from Omagh
Musicians from County Tyrone
1985 births
British country singers